Hallis Lake Cross Country Skiing Facility is a 75 kilometer network of trails in Quesnel, British Columbia maintained by the Cariboo Ski-Touring club. The trails are home to winter activities such as cross-country skiing and snowshoeing.

History
The facility was opened in 1995. In 1998, the 3,000 square foot lodge was opened to the public.

In 2006, Northern Development Initiative Trust granted $36,667 to Cariboo Ski Touring Club to go toward expansion of the trails.

In 2022, Hallis Lake hosted the BC Cup #3 Biathlon.

References

External links

Ski areas and resorts in British Columbia
Geography of the Cariboo